Jean Back (born 1953) is a Luxembourg writer, photographer and civil servant. He was born in Dudelange and studied in Esch-Alzette. A career civil servant, Back has met with success in creative pursuits such as photography and creative writing. His novel Amateur won the EU Prize for Literature.

Works
 Wollekestol (2003)
 Mon amour schwein (2007)
 Amateur (2009)
 Wéi Dag an Nuecht (2012)
 Karamell (2014)

References

External links

 

1953 births
Luxembourgian writers
Living people
People from Dudelange